Louisa Thynne may refer to:

Louisa Thynne, Viscountess Weymouth, (c.1712–1736), English noblewoman
Louisa Finch, Countess of Aylesford (born Louisa Thynne, 1760–1832), English naturalist and botanical illustrator